Paphies is a genus of large, edible, saltwater clams, marine bivalve molluscs in the family Mesodesmatidae. The genus is endemic to New Zealand. The species in this genus include the pipi (P. australis), tuatua (P. subtriangulata) and toheroa (P. ventricosa).

Species

 Paphies australis (Gmelin, 1790)
Paphies subtriangulata (Wood, 1828)
Paphies subtriangulata porrecta (Marwick, 1928)
Paphies subtriangulata quoyii (Deshayes, 1832)
Paphies subtriangulata subtriangulata (Wood, 1828)
 Paphies ventricosa (Gray, 1843)
  Paphies donacina  (Spengler, 1793)

References
 Checklist of New Zealand Mollusca
 Powell A W B, New Zealand Mollusca, William Collins Publishers Ltd, Auckland, New Zealand 1979 

Bivalves of New Zealand
Mesodesmatidae
Bivalve genera